Zygonyx natalensis, the blue cascader or powdered cascader is a species of dragonfly in the family Libellulidae. It is found in most of sub-saharan Africa.

Habitat
This species is found along streams and rivers; males are most frequently seen patrolling or hovering over rapids or waterfalls.

References

Libellulidae
Taxonomy articles created by Polbot
Insects described in 1900